The Temple of Fortuna Equestris (Latin: aedes Fortunae Equestris) was a temple dedicated to the goddess Fortuna in ancient Rome. Its precise location is unknown, though Vitruvius states it stood near the Theatre of Pompey. No evidence of it remains after 22 AD, meaning it was probably lost in the fire of 21 AD, which also damaged the Theatre of Pompey.

The temple was built by Quintus Fulvius Flaccus in fulfilment of a vow to the goddess in exchange for her support during his campaign in Hispania in 180 BC. He was allowed a triumph in Rome for his victory over the Celtiberians and built the temple in its memory. 'Equestris' refers to the equites, then seen as key to Roman victories. Flaccus dedicated it in 173 BC, when he was censor.

Flaccus had much of the marble roof of the Temple of Juno Lacinia in Kroton brought to Rome for use in the temple, but this led to outrage on the part of the senate, in that a censor (responsible for public morality) had not only partially demolished a temple belonging to one of Rome's allies, but also by doing so brought down the wrath of the gods upon Rome. The senate ordered him to send the roof back to Kroton and restore the temple he had damaged.

See also
List of Ancient Roman temples

References
L. Richardson, jr, A New Topographical Dictionary of Ancient Rome, Baltimore - London 1992. pp. 155-156. 

Fortuna Equestris
Temples of Fortuna
Destroyed temples
2nd-century BC religious buildings and structures